Tuscolameta Creek is a stream in the U.S. state of Mississippi.

Tuscolameta is a name derived from the Choctaw language meaning "young warrior". Variant names include "Tuscalameta", "Tuscalamita Creek", "Tushalamita", and "Tuskala Mita Creek".

In 1924, the Tuscolameta Creek received a 24 mile channelization to empty into the Pearl River.

References

Rivers of Mississippi
Rivers of Leake County, Mississippi
Rivers of Newton County, Mississippi
Rivers of Scott County, Mississippi
Mississippi placenames of Native American origin